Francisco Córdova may refer to:

Pancho Córdova (Francisco Córdova, 1916–1990), Mexican actor
Francisco Córdova (baseball), Mexican MLB left-handed starting pitcher
Francisco Córdova (basketball), represented Puerto Rico at the 1968 Summer Olympics
Francisco Cordoba (footballer) (born 1988), Colombian footballer 
Francisco Sebastián Córdova (born 1997), Mexican footballer

See also
Cordova (disambiguation)